Aled Jones is a Welsh singer and a television and radio presenter.

Aled Jones may also refer to:
 Aled Gruffydd Jones, Welsh historian
 Aled Haydn Jones, British radio presenter and former radio producer
 Aled Jones, investigator of impacts of climate and resource trends on finance and government with the Centre for the Understanding of Global Prosperity (CUSP) and the Global Sustainability Institute (GSI) at Anglia Ruskin University

See also 
Alex Jones (disambiguation)